Wilson Morrison (1851 – 28 October 1882) was a New Zealand cricketer. He played in one first-class match for Canterbury in 1877/78.

See also
 List of Canterbury representative cricketers

References

External links
 

1851 births
1882 deaths
New Zealand cricketers
Canterbury cricketers
Cricketers from Dublin (city)